The Yetties of Yetminster is the eighth album by English folk music group The Yetties from the North Dorset village of Yetminster released in 1975 on the Argo Records (UK) label.

Track listing

Side 1
"The Gypsy Rover" (Maguire)
"Bandy Bertha’s Birthday" (Hargreaves/Tilsey)
"One Morning in May" (Trad. Arr. The Yetties)
"Widdecombe Fair" (Trad. Arr. The Yetties)
"Downfield’s Delight" (Trad. Arr. The Yetties)
"Bread and Fishes" (Bell)
"The Gentleman Soldier" (Trad. Arr. The Yetties)

Side 2
"Dark Island" (Maclachlan/Silv)
"On a Monday Morning" (Tawney)
"Fling it Here (Fling it There)" (Lawrence/Yetties)
"The Marrow" (Oakley)
"Lord of the Dance" (Carter)g
"Beau Psaltery" (Trad. Arr. The Yetties)
"The Farming Contractor" (Trad. Arr. The Yetties)
 "Trelawney" (Trad. Ay

Musicians
Bob Common - Vocal & Drums
Pete Shutler - Accordion, Whistle, Psaltery & Vocal
Bonny Sartin - Lead Vocal
Mac McCulloch - Guitar & Vocal
with Dave Green - Bass, and the Alan Cohen Orchestra
(Alan Cohen Orchestra recorded by Iain Churches)

Production
Produced and Recorded by: Kevin Daly

References

External links
 The Yetties' Official Website
Scrumpy and Western website

Scrumpy and Western
1975 albums